A furrow is a line cut in soil when ploughed in order to plant a crop.

Furrow may also refer to:
 The Furrow, an Irish Roman Catholic theological periodical
 Furrows (film), a 1951 Spanish film

People with the surname
 Buford O. Furrow, Jr. (born 1961), American neo-Nazi
 James Furrow, American theologian

See also
 Cleavage furrow, the indentation of the cell's surface that begins the progression of cleavage